Vladimír Hirsch (born 3 July 1954, Benešov, Czechoslovakia) is a Czech composer and instrumentalist (keyboard instruments). The author of the concept of the so-called "integrated" musical form – combining contemporary classical music with dark-ambient and industrial music, his compositional style is characterized by polymodal architecture and alchemical work with sound, using mainly digital techniques to expand the action potential of the means of expression. Vladimír Hirsch is or was the leader of the avant-garde projects Aghiatrias, Skrol, Zygote, Subpop Squeeze, and more. From 1986 to 1996, he was a member of the experimental post-punk band Der Marabu. Vladimír Hirsch graduated from the Faculty of Medicine at Charles University in Prague and has been practicing medicine with shorter or longer breaks.

Biography and style
Vladimír Hirsch was born in Benešov, lived in Ledeč nad Sázavou until he was 18 and then moved to Prague, where he now lives and works. Composing since 1973, he started with small romantic and classical compositions for piano and organ, but very soon abandoned the experiments and devoted himself only to rock and jazz. A long-time member of the Prague-based post-punk group Der Marabu, after its disintegration, he founded the ensemble Skrol (1995) and several other parallel projects like Aghiatrias, Zygote, Subpop Squeeze, Luminar Ax, etc.

Without ever abandoning his projects and ensembles, in 1987 the composer began working in parallel on solo production, and around 2002 it became his main program. Emphasizing the use of modern means of expression and the search for specific compositional techniques, he bring together serial, atonal, microtonal, polymodal, and spectral music. Partly inspired by the traditions of 20th-century Slavic classical music, Vladimír Hirsch keeps building hybrid working models in tonal principles, composition, and instrumentation. Using digital techniques for classical orchestras together with a wide range of sound sources, he searches to achieve the alchemical transformation of sounds into a homogeneous, indivisible substance. This principle, called "integrated music" by itself, also represents the metaphysical idea of the creative concept, which consists in the collision and reconciliation of two seemingly opposite spiritual worlds within an individual.

Vladimír Hirsch regularly gives concerts both at home and abroad, including tours in the USA, Germany, Great Britain and Italy. In 2010, an eight-disc set of key recordings was released by the Italian publishing house Ars Benevola Mater entitled "The Assent to Paradoxon". He has also collaborated with foreign artists on different projects like Dawn Carlyle aka Dove Hermosa, Nadya Feir, Cecilia Bjärgö, Igor Vaganov, Alessandro Aru or Kenji Siratori.

Creations
Vladimír Hirsch's music lingers between experimental projects and compositions of a very strict compositional order, but is almost always of a conceptual nature: "It is the work of a non-conformist individualist, forging a completely original aesthetic form, where the unifying element is a rather dark, emotionally tense, often apocalyptic atmosphere of compositions, characterized by their metaphysical, existential anxiety, and spirituality." (Stephen Ellis)His most notable works include "Symphony No. 4" with the subtitle "Snímání z kříže" (in English: "Descent from the Cross") and its revised, live version "Graue Passion" (Šedé pašije); the conceptual dark ambient albums "Underlying Scapes", "Exorcisms", "Invocations" and "Scripta Soli"; the extensive ingressive composition "Contemplatio per nexus"; the post-industrial mass "Missa Armata"; the composition for piano, percussion and combined electroacoustic techniques "Endoanathymia"; the digital symphony "Axonal Transit"; the microtonal dark ambient album" Epidemic Mind"; the selection of compositions for organ and piano "Selected Organ and Piano Works", and Concerto for Organ No. 2 "Horae".

While the composer's work seems to be permeated by a very elaborate and authentic expression of the internal conflict of values within the individual and one's confrontation with the anthropocentric model of contemporary society, the composer disagrees it was the initial idea in throughout the compositions. For the insiders of the industrial and post-industrial scene, Vladimír Hirsch produces very intense, full of suggestive and stormy atmosphere music.

Vladimír Hirsch is included in Olivier Bernard's Anthology of Ambient Music, and in the encyclopedic publication of composers of contemporary world music.

Selected compositions
Hirsch's work is represented by the activities of his ensembles and also by an extensive collection of solo works. He is the composer of a number of conceptual albums, several symphonies, suites, concert and experimental compositions, stage music, and many smaller compositions.

Selected compositions 
Synthetics – Themes, op. 17, album of experimental compositions of electronic music, 1987
Symphony no. 1 in E, Op. 20; symphony for two synthesizers, 1988–9
The Ambits Of Material World; cycle of organ compositions, 1990
7 Parts Of Desolation, op. 29; thematic piano cycle, 1986–1991
Aion, op. 33; composition for organ, water harp and field sound recordings, 1992
Simplicity Of Heresy, op. 37; suite for integrated music ensemble, 1996
Nenia, op. 40; experimental organ composition, 1996
Musik für die Metamorphose, op. 45; stage music for theatrical transcription of a short story Franze Kafky "Proměna", 1997
Symphony no. 2 "Defensa", op. 47; symphony for synthesizers and digital technology, 1997
Concert industriel pour orgue, op. 49; concert for organ, percussion and integrated ensemble, 1997–8, existing in three versions (49a, b, c)
Casual Crime, op. 51; compositions for jazz quartet, 1977–1998
Symphony no. 3 "Brands Of Tyranny", op. 52; symphony for integrated orchestra, organ, percussion and female vocals, 1998-9
Sense Geometry, op. 54; experimental electronic-industrial composition, 1998
Dances & Marches, op. 57; suite for organ, piano and integrated ensemble, 1998
Exorcisms, op. 61; suite for Integrated File, 2000, revised 2006
Trigonal Sonata, op. 62; sonata for two pianos and digital technique, 2000
Missa armata, op. 64; industrial mass for the integrated ensemble, 1999–2004, later reworked and renamed "Cryptosynaxis"
Elegy, op. 65; experimental composition for piano and "gas-organ" (gas organ), 2000
Symphony no. 4, “Descent From The Cross” (Snímání z kříže), op. 67; symphony for integrated orchestra, solos and choir on the theme of Dostoevsky's interpretation of the painting of the same name by Hans Holbein Jr. from the altar cycle "Graue Passion" ("Šedé pašije"), 2001
De regionibus liminis, op. 68; ambient-industrial electronic album, later reworked and renamed Underlying Scapes, 2003
Hermeneutic cycle, op. 70, cycle of compositions for piano, percussion, integrated ensemble and digital technology, 2004; reworked as the concept album Endoanathymia, 2009–2010
Les scènes ardentes, op. 72; conceptual album, album of compositions for integrated electroacoustic technology, 2004
Nonterra, op. 73; concept album, suite for integrated technology, 2005
Torment Of Naissance, op. 79, composition for integrated technology, concept album, 2007
Contemplatio per nexus, op. 77; two-movement composition for an integrated musical ensemble and solo singing on a theme, inspired by the work "Teologia spiritualis mystica", dealing with the process of transformation of human consciousness during mystical contemplation, 2008
Tobruk, op. 82, originally a soundtrack, later a thematic album, 2008
Epidemic Mind, op. 81, experimental electronic (electroacoustic) album, 2008
Graue Passion, op. 67b, completely revised version of the 4th symphony, 2009
Markéta, the daughter of Lazar, op. 85, stage music for a theatrical play based on Vladislav Vančura's short story "Markéta Lazarová", 2009–2010
Lamiadae: Symmetric Variations, op. 88, compositions for 2 pianos and integrated technique 2011
Horae, op.90, composition for two organs, integrated ensemble, clock machines, field records and digital technology, 2012
Craving Urania, op. 95, composition for integrated techniques, 2014
Do Not Let Us Perish (St.Wenceslaus), op. 96, composition for integrated techniques (variations on the theme of the St. Wenceslas Chorale, 2015
Scripta Soli, op. 91, conceptual dark ambient album in the spirit of "integrated concrete music", 2017
Ex Litteris Of St.Paul, op. 98, conceptual album based on citations from St.Paul epistles, 2020
Le Grand Jeu, op.99, conceptual album for pianos and integrated techniques, 2021

Discography
 Synthetics – Themes, MC, D.M.R. 1987, (reissue CDr, CatchArrow Recordings 1999)
 Organ Pieces, MC, D.M.R. 1991, (reissue CDr, CatchArrow Recordings 2001)
 Cruci-Fiction (Der Marabu)”, MC, D,M,R,, 1994, (reissue CDr, CatchArrow Recordings 2000)
 There's No Human Triumph”, CDr, CatchArrow Recordings, 1996
 All Of Us Will Fall Away” (Der Marabu), CDr, CatchArrow Recordings, 1996
 Casual Crime, CDr, CatchArrow Recordings, 1998
 Martyria (Skrol), 10", Loki Foundation (Power & Steel), 1999
 Heretical Antiphony (Skrol), CD, M.D.Propaganda, 1999
 Dreams Of Awakening, CD, CatchArrow Recordings, 1999
 Geometrie nevědomí (Zygote), CDr, CatchArrow Recordings, 2000
 Insomnia Dei (Skrol), CD, RRRecords, 2001
 Epidaemia Vanitatis (Aghiatrias), CD, Integrated Music Records, 2002
 Symphony no.2 & 3, CDr, CatchArrow Recordings, 2003
 Regions Of Limen (Aghiatrias), Epidemie Records, 2004
 Fragments, thèmes et images scéniques, CDr, CatchArrow Recordings, 2005
 Dances & Marches For The Orphan Age (Skrol), CD, Dagaz Music, 2005
 Sense Geometry, CD, Ars Benevola Mater, 2006
 Ethos (Aghiatrias), Epidemie Records, 2006
 Torment Of Naissance, CDr, Integrated Music Records, 2007
 Concert industriel pour orgue, CD, Ars Benevola Mater, 2007
 Epidemic Mind, CDr, Integrated Music Records, 2008
 Symphony No.4 Descent From The Cross, CD, Ars Benevola Mater, 2008
 Tobruk, CDr, CatchArrow Recordings, 2008
 Exorcisms, CD, Ars Benevola Mater, 2008
 Nonterra, CD, Ars Benevola Mater, 2008
 Les scènes ardentes, CD, Ars Benevola Mater, 2009
 Contemplatio per nexus, CD, Ars Benevola Mater, 2009
 New Laws, New Orders (Skrol), CD, Twilight Records, 2009
 Graue Passion, CD, Ars Benevola Mater, 2009
 Underlying Scapes, CD, Ars Benevola Mater, 2009
 The Assent to Paradoxon, 8 CD, Ars Benevola Mater, 2010 (collection)
 Cryptosynaxis, DVD, Integrated Music Records, 2010
 Markéta, dcera Lazarova, CDr, Integrated Music Records, 2010
 Endoanathymia, CDr, Integrated Music Records, 2011
 Missa Armata . Invocationes, CD, Ars Benevola Mater, 2012
 Epidemic Mind, Surrism-Phonoethics, digital, 2013
 Selected Organ & Piano Works, Integrated Music Records / Surrism-Phonoethics; CDr, digital, 2013
 Axonal Transit (Symphony No.5), Integrated Music Records; CD, 2014
 Horae (Organ Concerto No.2), Surrism-Phonoethics; digital 2015
 Introscan (Subpop Squeeze), CatchArrow Recordings, digital, 2016
 Anacreontics (Subpop Squeeze), E-Klageto (a division of PsychKG), CD, 2017
 Scripta Soli, Old Captain, CD, 2017
 Ecstatic Arc, live, Integrated Music Records, digital, 2018
 Eschaton (Skrol), Old Captain, CD, 2019
 Ex Litteris Of St.Paul, Integrated Music Records, digital, 2020
 Katagenesis, symphonies nos.5 and 6 + Do Not Let Us Perish, Zoharum  Old Captain, CD, 2021
 Le Grand Jeu, a conceptual album for pianos and integrated techniques, Integrated Music Records, 2021
 Artefacts, a conceptual selection of tracks for compilations of "VA" type for integrated techniques, Integrated Music Records, 2022

Other activities 
Vladimír Hirsch also deals with computer graphics: among other things, he is the author of the design of all his solo albums and the vast majority of albums of his projects. In this regard, he often collaborates with the Czech art photographer Jan Vávra, a representative of the so-called neopictorialism, whose works became a model for the unified design of Hirsch's set of albums "The Assent to Paradoxon". He is also the author of a number of articles and essays. not only on music and art. He has long been committed to the use of the geographical names Czechia (Česko).

References

External links

1954 births
Living people
Czech composers
Czech male composers
Czech keyboardists
Czech organists
Charles University alumni